Wayne M. Becker is emeritus professor of Botany at the University of Wisconsin and, under the name W. M. Becker, the original author, and for the next six editions, senior author of The World of the Cell (Pearson).
Becker first joined the University of Wisconsin in 1958 and obtained his PhD in 1967. He received his B.S, M.S., and Ph.D in biochemistry at this college. Becker spent two years in the United Kingdom as a NATO/NIH postdoctoral researcher, and then returned to the campus in 1969 as a member of the Botany Department Faculty. He also spent a year in the same position at the University of Edinburgh.

In 1995, he put his research aside and began to focus on undergraduate teaching, especially students of color and those from poor backgrounds. He has also taught at the University of Indonesia in Jakarta; Canterbury University at Christchurch, New Zealand; University of Puerto Rico at Mayaguez; and the Interfaculty Program in Biomedical Ethics at Harvard University.

Works

References

Living people
University of Wisconsin–Madison faculty
University of Wisconsin–Madison College of Agricultural and Life Sciences alumni
American biochemists
Year of birth missing (living people)